

Ælfstan (or Aelfstan ) was a medieval Bishop of London.

Ælfstan was consecrated 959 and 964 and he died between 995 and 996.

Citations

References

External links
 

Bishops of London
10th-century English bishops
990s deaths
Year of birth unknown